Gousto, a trading name of SCA Investments Limited, is a British meal kit retailer, headquartered in Shepherd's Bush, London, founded by Timo Boldt and James Carter. Gousto supplies subscribers with recipe kit boxes which include ready-measured, fresh ingredients and easily followed recipes.

History 
In August 2013, Gousto's co-founders appeared on the BBC's Dragons' Den.

In December 2015, Gousto raised £9m in funding from BGF Ventures, MMC Ventures,  Unilever Ventures and the Angel Co-Fund, with a further £10m in November 2016.

In October 2016, Gousto's co-founder Timo Boldt was awarded IGD's 'Young Entrepreneur of the Year' award.

In January 2019, Gousto raised £18m in funding from Unilever Ventures, Hargreave Hale, MMC Ventures, the Angel CoFund, and fitness coach Joe Wicks.

In July 2019, Gousto raised £30m in funding from private equity firm Perwyn.

In February 2020, Gousto partnered with UK-based The Meatless Farm Company to build upon Gousto's objective of tapping into the growing audience of vegan and other consumers looking to reduce their meat consumption.

In April 2020, Gousto raised £33m in funding from Perwyn, BGF Ventures, and MMC Ventures, and Joe Wicks.

Recognition 
The company won Retail Business of the Year at the 2015 Startups awards, the Angel-VC Deal of the Year at the 2015 UK Business Angels Association Awards, the Young Entrepreneur of the Year award (CEO and founder, Timo Boldt) at the 2014 Great British Entrepreneur Awards, and the Everline Future50 at the 2014 Real Business Awards.

It has been voted best recipe kit service by the Independent, the Guardian, the Metro and Time Out London.

See also
 Online grocer
 Meal kit
 List of online grocers

References

 Gousto dinner box firm lands investment boost

External links
 

Online retailers of the United Kingdom
British companies established in 2012
Retail companies established in 2012
Transport companies established in 2012
Internet properties established in 2012
Online grocers
Subscription services